Emil Holst (born 9 January 1991) is a Danish badminton player. He competed at the 2015 European Games and won a silver medal in the men's singles.

Achievements

European Games 
Men's singles

European Junior Championships 
Boys' singles

Boys' doubles

BWF International Challenge/Series 
Men's singles

Men's doubles

  BWF International Challenge tournament
  BWF International Series tournament
  BWF Future Series tournament

References

External links 

 

1991 births
Living people
People from Køge Municipality
Sportspeople from Copenhagen
Danish male badminton players
Badminton players at the 2015 European Games
European Games silver medalists for Denmark
European Games medalists in badminton
21st-century Danish people